António Teixeira was a Portuguese footballer who played as a defender.

Football career 

Teixeira gained 1 cap for Portugal when he played against Italy on 12 April 1931 in Porto, in a 0-2 defeat.

External links 
 
 

Portuguese footballers
Association football defenders
C.S. Marítimo players
Portugal international footballers
Year of death missing
Year of birth missing